Beatriz Mesquita also known as Bia Mesquita is a Brazilian Jiu Jitsu (BJJ) competitor with arguably the best competitive record in both Gi and Nogi of all time having won 24 titles at black belt level in the 4 major Gi Championships.  With 10x gold medals, as of Worlds 2021, she holds the record for the most IBJJF World Championship titles at black belt level and is a member of the IBJJF Hall of Fame.

Career 
Beatriz de Oliveira Mesquita began training Brazilian jiu-jitsu at aged five in 1996, besides jiujitsu she also trained in judo, wrestling and swimming. By the time she was 10 she had won the Brazilian National Junior Championships, three State Championships and several other major tournaments, she was sent to train under BJJ legend Leticia Ribeiro, in Tijuca, Rio de Janeiro. At 15 she trained in Freestyle wrestling winning a junior state title before dedicating herself to BJJ. She received her brown belt in June 2009 from professor Leticia Ribeiro, while standing on the podium of the World Championship. She went on to receive her black belt in March 2011 again from professor Ribeiro. In 2017 she defeated UFC fighter and 2x World Jiu Jitsu Black Belt Champion Mackenzie Dern in 64 seconds at their first competitive meeting in the Rio Falls Jiu Jitsu open. In June 2018 Mesquita became the Eddie Bravo Invitational (EBI) Women's Bantamweight Champion submitting Luana Alzuguir in the Semi-final and Bianca Basílio in the final. On 12 December 2021, Mesquita won her 10th world title at the 2021 World Jiu-Jitsu Championship after beating Margot Ciccarelli in the semi-final and Luiza Monteiro in the final. At the 2022 ADCC World Championship Mesquita defeated Mayssa Bastos via points but then lost to Ffion Davies in the semi-finals; Mesquita won bronze after defeating Bianca Basilio by submission.

Brazilian Jiu-Jitsu competitive summary 
Major gi championships:

10x World Championship champion
7x Pan-American Championship champion
4x European Championship champion
3x Brazilian Nationals champion

Major Nogi championships:

5x World Nogi Championship champion
7x Brazilian Nationals Nogi Championship champion

Submission Fighting:

Bronze medal at the 2022 ADCC Submission Fighting World Championship in the 60 kg category.
Gold medal at the 2017 ADCC Submission Fighting World Championship in the 60 kg category.

Personal life 
In January 2021, she announced being engaged to fellow BJJ competitor Patrick Gaudio after he proposed to her.

Instructor lineage 
Royler Gracie → Vini Aieta →  Leticia Ribeiro → Beatriz Mesquita

References 

Brazilian practitioners of Brazilian jiu-jitsu
Living people
1991 births
People awarded a black belt in Brazilian jiu-jitsu
Brazilian jiu-jitsu world champions (women)
World No-Gi Brazilian Jiu-Jitsu Championship medalists
ADCC Submission Fighting World Champions (women)